Gönül Engin Yılmaz is a Turkish artist, focused on landscapes, still lifes, floral and portraits.

Biography 

She was born on 23 June 1949, in Istanbul, Turkey. She is a graduate of Robert College (ACG) and the Technical University of Istanbul.

She lives in Istanbul, Turkey, where she has been working as a professional tour guide.

Gönül Engin Yılmaz has participated in many exhibitions and one-man shows in the USA and Turkey. Many of her paintings are held in private collections.

Gallery

References

External 
www.gonulenginyilmaz.com
https://www.youtube.com/watch?v=vo61FBiA9Oo

1949 births
Living people
Turkish artists